Pomegranate Communications is a publishing and printing company formerly based in Petaluma, California, having moved to Portland, Oregon in 2013. The company, founded by Thomas F. Burke, began by publishing works of psychedelic art from San Francisco in 1968 under the name ThoFra Distributors. It distributed posters for concerts at Avalon Ballroom and The Fillmore.

Anchored in visual arts, Pomegranate was active in book publishing in the past as well, especially during the 1990s. Adjustments in that sector caused it to reduce involvement accordingly. Currently calendars - long a mainstay - remain a strong part of their catalog, along with coloring books for all ages, nature books and puzzles.

In its current form, Pomegranate is best described as a museum publisher, collaborating with institutions such as the National Gallery of Art, the Library of Congress, the British Library, the Smithsonian Museum of American Art, the Sierra Club, the Frank Lloyd Wright Foundation, and the Museum of Fine Arts, Boston. It is the licensee for artists M. C. Escher, Edward Gorey, Charley Harper, Wolf Kahn, Georgia O'Keeffe, and Gustave Baumann. Its monograph by Elizabeth Murray - Monet’s Passion has been reprinted extensively, and Irene Hardwicke Olivieri's Closer to Wildness has thrived.

Books published by Pomegranate
Visions, introduction by Walter Hopps (1977) , with works by Cliff McReynolds, Bill Martin, Thomas Akawie and Gage Taylor.
In Pursuit of the Unicorn, (1980) , by Josephine Bradley, with works by Kirwan (illustrator), Susan Seddon Boulet (illustrator), Charles Ware (illustrator), Niki Broyles (illustrator), Sandy Stedronsky (illustrator), Marjette Schille (illustrator), Jay Burch (illustrator)
Haiku: Japanese Art and Poetry, 2010 , by Judith Patt, Barry Till, and Michiko Warkentyne

References

External links
Pomegranate website
 D&B Hoover's Company Profile

Psychedelic art
M. C. Escher
Companies based in Portland, Oregon
Jigsaw puzzle manufacturers